The 1956–57 IHL season was the 12th season of the International Hockey League (IHL), a North American minor professional ice hockey league. Six teams participated in the regular season, and the Cincinnati Mohawks won the Turner Cup.

Regular season

Turner Cup-Playoffs

Turner Cup playoffs

Semifinals
Cincinnati Mohawks 3, Huntington Hornets 1

Toledo Mercurys 3, Indianapolis Chiefs 2

Turner Cup Finals
Cincinnati Mohawks 3, Indianapolis Chiefs 0

Awards

Coaches
Cincinnati Mohawks: Rollie McLenahan
Fort Wayne Komets: Doug McCaig
Huntington Hornets: Eddie Olson
Indianapolis Chiefs Leo Lamoureux
Toledo Mercurys: Butch Stahan
Troy Bruins: Nels Podolsky

References

Attendance Figures - Cincinnati Enquirer 03-13-1957 through 03-27-1957

External links 
 Season 1956/57 on hockeydb.com 

IHL
International Hockey League (1945–2001) seasons